Seashore Trolley Museum, located in Kennebunkport, Maine, United States, is the world's first and largest museum of mass transit vehicles. While the main focus of the collection is trolley cars (trams), it also includes rapid transit trains, Interurban cars, trolley buses, and motor buses. The Seashore Trolley Museum is owned and operated by the New England Electric Railway Historical Society (NEERHS). Of the museum's collection of more than 350 vehicles, ten trolley, and railroad cars that historically operated in Maine were listed on the National Register of Historic Places in 1980, as Maine Trolley Cars.

History 

Theodore F. Santarelli de Brasch and Osmond Richard Cummings were two of the founders of the museum, which was initially operated as the Seashore Electric Railway. Santarelli graduated from Harvard University and led the museum until he died in 1987; Cummings, a New England railroad historian, died in 2013.

The events that led to the formation of the museum started in 1939 when a group of railfans learned that the Biddeford and Saco Railroad were purchasing motor buses to replace its fleet of trolley cars.  More and more trolley companies were doing this as the technology of buses had developed to the point that they were reliable and economical.

The rail fans decided to find out if they could purchase a trolley to preserve it for posterity.  The railroad was willing to sell them a car (#31, a 12 bench open trolley) for $150.  However, it would have to be moved to another location due to local ordinances that prohibited retired trolleys from being used as houses, even though this was not the rail fans' intention.

A portion of farmland was rented on Log Cabin Road in Kennebunkport, adjacent to the right-of-way for the Atlantic Shore Line Railway's Kennebunk-Biddeford route, and the trolley was moved to it.

At about the same time, another group of rail fans purchased a trolley from the Manchester and Nashua Street Railway.  The two groups merged, and the Nashua trolley was brought to the Log Cabin Road site. The group of founders formally incorporated in 1941 as the New England Electric Railway Historical Society.

World War II caused the museum to be put on hold, as many members served in the armed forces for the duration. This also brought about a temporary revival of trolley services in many cities, as rubber and gasoline were rationed for the war effort.

After the war, conversion of trolley lines to buses resumed, and created a period of rapid growth for the museum's collection.

In the 1950s, a diesel-powered electric generator was used to allow the cars to move under their own power. Car 31 was moved into a small building so that it could be repaired and restored. The first major expansion occurred in late 1955 and early 1956, when the Society purchased land near the Biddeford city line along U.S. Route 1. In the summer of 1956, the Seashore Electric Railway began passenger operations on weekends over its  of track.

In 1980, ten of the museum's trolley and railroad cars were listed on the National Register of Historic Places (as "Maine Trolley Cars").  These include trolley #31 and other vehicles either built or operated in Maine.  Two cars of the Aroostook Valley Railroad, and two built by the York Utilities Company of Sanford are included in this collection.

As of 2010, the museum had over 260 vehicles.  While most are from New England and other areas of the United States, trolleys from Canada, Australia, Japan, Germany, Hungary, England, Scotland, Italy, and several other countries are also in the collection. One of the motor buses the museum owns is Biddeford and Saco #31, the bus that replaced trolley #31 in 1939.  The bus was donated to the museum by the bus company. The Seashore Trolley Museum continues to acquire new vehicles for the collection.

Exhibits and features 

The main building at the museum, the Visitors Center, includes a ticket booth, a museum store with an extensive collection of rare and out-of-print books and DVDs as well as many toys and souvenirs, a snack bar, and an exhibit room with trolley and transit-related artifacts.

The trolleys that have been restored to operating condition are shown on display in three car barns. A restoration shop with an elevated observation gallery shows visitors how the vehicles are maintained and restored. Additional storage barns and tracks, which are not accessible to the general public, contain vehicles that are awaiting restoration. A few of the restored trolleys are operating on the demonstration line at one time.Restored trolleys are used on the museum's demonstration railway, which follows the route of the Atlantic Shore Line, a trolley line that ran on the current museum property and connected Kennebunkport to York Beach. Since the line was abandoned in the 1920s, museum volunteers have rebuilt  from scratch. A demonstration route leads  to Talbott Park (which is a loop to turn around the trolleys) and back to the Visitor Center.

The collection of trolley buses includes vehicles from all over the country, and the world, of which about twenty are in operating condition.  Restoration on as many as six to seven cars is underway at all times. Discussions are under way to extend the trolley bus line and to rehabilitate the existing line.

The museum holds many themed events throughout the operating season (May–December) including Pumpkin Patch Trolley, Daniel Tiger Visits Seashore, appreciation days for several operating fleet trolleys in its collection, free children's story time for guests and the community, and special holiday rides in November and December.  The exhibit room may be rented for parties, gatherings, meetings or family reunions.

See also

 Boston Street Railway Association
 Heritage railway
 List of heritage railways
 National Register of Historic Places listings in York County, Maine
 Shore Line Trolley Museum
 State of the Art Car

References

External links

 The Seashore Trolley Museum website

Railroad museums in Maine
Heritage railroads in Maine
Museums in York County, Maine
Street railway museums in the United States
Buildings and structures in Kennebunkport, Maine
Transportation buildings and structures in York County, Maine